is a Japanese writer. She has been nominated five times for the Naoki Prize and won the 150th Naoki Prize for her novel . Two of her novels have been adapted for film.

Early life and education 
Himeno was born in 1958 in Shiga Prefecture, Japan. She moved to Tokyo and graduated from Aoyama Gakuin University, then worked part-time at a gallery so she could return frequently to Shiga Prefecture and help with her father's illness.

Career 
At age 32 Himeno made her fiction debut in 1990 with her comedic novel . More novels and essay collections followed, including the 1991 essay collection , the 1992 novel , and the 1995 essay collection . Himeno's novel , a story about a woman in a convent who grows a talking face near her genitals after asking God for help, was published in 1997 and shortlisted for the Naoki Prize. Junan was later adapted into a 2013 film of the same name starring Mayuko Iwasa.

In 2003 her novel , a story that follows young girls from second grade through first loves and sexual experiences, was nominated for the Naoki Prize. Tsu, i, ra, ku was later adapted into one segment of the 2005 anthology film female (フィーメイル) starring Kyōko Hasegawa. Her 2005 novel  and 2010 novel  were also nominated for the Naoki Prize in their respective years, but did not win. In 2009 Himeno collaborated with manga artist Ebine Yamaji to create the book .

After being nominated five times for the Naoki Prize, Himeno won the 150th Naoki Prize for her semi-autobiographical 2013 novel . Himeno was exercising at the gym at the time of the announcement and had to rush to the press conference in her tracksuit, which she joked about with reporters in her interviews.

Recognition
 2014 150th Naoki Prize (2013下)

Film adaptations
 female (フィーメイル), 2005
 , 2013

Works
 , Kodansha, 1990, 
 , Shufunotomo, 1990, 
 , Mainichi Shimbunsha, 1991, 
 , Kodansha, 1992, 
 , Mainichi Shimbunsha, 1995, 
 , Bungeishunjū, 1997, 
 , Kadokawa Shoten, 2003, 
 , Bungeishunjū, 2005, 
 (with Ebine Yamaji) , Fusosha, 2009, 
 , Gentosha, 2013,

References

1958 births
Living people
21st-century Japanese novelists
21st-century Japanese women writers
Japanese women novelists
Naoki Prize winners
People from Shiga Prefecture
Writers from Shiga Prefecture